Glodeni is a city in the northwest of Moldova; it is the seat of Glodeni District. Its population as of 2012 was 11,600. One village, Stîrcea, is administered by the city.

Media 
 Vocea Basarabiei, 100,3

International relations

Twin towns – sister cities
Glodeni is twinned with:

 Botoșani, Romania
 Sharhorod, Ukraine

References

Cities and towns in Moldova
Beletsky Uyezd
Bălți County (Romania)
Glodeni District